Polypedates is a genus of frogs in the family Rhacophoridae, the shrub frogs and Paleotropic tree frogs. They belong to subfamily Rhacophorinae. Members of this genus are collectively known as whipping frogs. They occur in eastern and southern Asia.

The delimitation of Polypedates versus the related Rhacophorus has been difficult. In former times, the present genus was often entirely included in Rhacophorus. However, molecular phylogenetic studies support the recognition of both genera. Polypedates + Taruga are considered to be the sister taxon of Feihyla + Rhacophorus.

Species
The following species are recognised in the genus Polypedates, with new species still being described on a regular basis:

 Polypedates assamensis Mathew & Sen, 2009
 Polypedates bengalensis Purkayastha et al., 2019
 Polypedates braueri (Vogt, 1911) – White-lipped treefrog or Java treefrog 
 Polypedates colletti (Boulenger, 1890) – Collett's whipping frog, black-spotted tree frog, or Collett's tree frog 
 Polypedates cruciger Blyth, 1852 – Sri Lanka whipping frog or common hour-glass tree-frog
 Polypedates discantus Rujirawan, Stuart, and Aowphol, 2013 – Malayan slender treefrog
 Polypedates hecticus Peters, 1863 – Samara flying frog
 Polypedates himalayensis (Annandale, 1912) – Himalayan tree frog
 Polypedates impresus Yang, 2008
 Polypedates insularis Das, 2005 – Nicobarese tree frog
 Polypedates iskandari Riyanto, Mumpuni & McGuire, 2011
 Polypedates leucomystax (Gravenhorst, 1829) – common tree frog, four-lined tree frog, striped tree frog, "white-lipped tree frog" (formerly often in P. maculatus)
 Polypedates macrotis (Boulenger, 1891) – Bongao tree frog
 Polypedates maculatus (Gray, 1830) – common Indian tree frog, Chunam tree frog
 Polypedates megacephalus Hallowell, 1861 – spot-legged tree frog, Hong Kong whipping frog, "brown tree frog"
 Polypedates mutus (Smith, 1940) – northern treefrog
 Polypedates occidentalis Das and Dutta, 2006 – western tree frog
 Polypedates otilophus (Boulenger, 1893) – file-eared tree frog, Borneo eared frog
 Polypedates pseudocruciger Das and Ravichandran, 1998 – false hour-glass tree frog or yellow tree frog 
 Polypedates pseudotilophus Matsui, Hamidy, and Kuraishi, 2014
 Polypedates ranwellai Wickramasingha, Munindradasa, and Fernando, 2012 – Ranwella's spined tree frog
 Polypedates subansiriensis Mathew & Sen, 2009 – Subansiri's tree frog
 Polypedates taeniatus (Boulenger, 1906) – Bengal whipping Frog, Bengal whipping tree frog, or Terai tree frog
 Polypedates teraiensis (Dubois, 1987) – common tree frog, six-lined tree frog, Terai tree frog, or Perching frog 
 Polypedates zed (Dubois, 1987) – Nepalese tree frog or Narayanghat whipping frog

The recently described Polypedates bijui has now been renamed as Beddomixalus bijui, the only species in its genus.

Phylogeny
The following phylogeny of Polypedates is from Pyron & Wiens (2011). 8 species are included. Polypedates is a sister group of Feihyla. Together, Polypedates and Feihyla form a sister group to Rhacophorus.

Kuraishi, et al. (2013) gives the following phylogeny of Polypedates. Polypedates and Rhacophorus are estimated to have split off from their most recent common ancestor 26.6 million years ago during the Oligocene. Furthermore, the genus Taruga has been separated as a separate genus endemic to Sri Lanka.

References

External links
 

 
Rhacophoridae
Amphibians of Asia
Amphibian genera
Taxa named by Johann Jakob von Tschudi